Cedar Springs is an unincorporated community in west Falls County, Texas, United States. It is located on Farm-to-market road #2027.

Unincorporated communities in Falls County, Texas
Unincorporated communities in Texas